Secret Rites is a 1971 British pseudo drama directed by Derek Ford. It concerns the study of witchcraft and black magic, with a rare appearance by real-life occultist Alex Sanders.
The film's music was composed by Bryn Walton and played by The Spindle.

Cast
 Alex Sanders
 Penny Beeching
 Tony Barton
 Jane Spearing
 Shirley Harmer
 Jane Spearing
 Lee Peters (narrator)

References

External links
 

1971 films
British drama films
Films directed by Derek Ford
1970s English-language films
1970s British films